Hibbertia sulcata is a species of flowering plant in the family Dilleniaceae and is only known from a single specimen collected in Arnhem Land in the Northern Territory. It is a small, sprawling shrub with wiry branches, linear leaves and yellow flowers arranged singly or in pairs in leaf axils with 22 to 24 stamens arranged in groups around two densely scaly carpels.

Description

Taxonomy
Hibbertia sulcata was first formally described in 2010 by Hellmut R. Toelken in the Journal of the Adelaide Botanic Gardens from a specimen collected in north-eastern Arnhem Land in 2002. The specific epithet (sulcata) means "furrowed", referring to the edges of the leaves.

Distribution
This hibbertia is only known from a single specimen collected from the Gudjekbinj outstation.

Conservation status
Hibbertia sulcata is classified as "data deficient" under the Northern Territory Government Northern Territory Government Territory Parks and Wildlife Conservation Act 1976.

See also
List of Hibbertia species

References

sulcata
Flora of the Northern Territory
Plants described in 2010
Taxa named by Hellmut R. Toelken